Undiscovered is the debut album by English singer-songwriter James Morrison, released in the United Kingdom on 10 July 2006. In its first week, the album sold 84,611 units in the UK going straight to the top of the UK Albums Chart. By the end of 2006, the album had sold 847,135 copies in the UK and certified multi-platinum; as of 2020, its total sales count stood at over 1,500,000 units.

The album enjoyed commercial success in other countries: it has been certified platinum in Australia and Ireland. It was particularly successful in New Zealand, where the first single off the album, "You Give Me Something", reached number one and the album was certified gold.

Album information
When James Morrison was in New Zealand, and appeared on the New Zealand Idol show, the two finalists asked Morrison about the meaning behind the song "You Give Me Something", and Morrison said that it was intended to be a 'harsh love song', and the lyrics mean that the protagonist of the song does not love the person as much as she loves him, but is willing to give the relationship a try.

Several of the album's songs were featured in TV shows. The album's lead single, "You Give Me Something", appeared in an episode of American television series Ugly Betty, an episode of Doctor Who, and a promo for FX. The song "This Boy" appeared in an episode of the CW show One Tree Hill (Series 4, Episode 17). The bonus track "Better Man" was played in an episode of What About Brian and in an episode of Grey's Anatomy.

Track listing

Charts

Weekly charts

Year-end charts

Certifications

References

2006 debut albums
James Morrison (singer) albums
Universal Music Group albums
Albums produced by Eg White
Albums produced by Steve Robson